Jens Kolding (born 12 July 1952) is a Danish former footballer who played for B93 and Brøndby in Denmark, and Roda JC in the Netherlands, as a striker. He played six games for the Denmark national football team from 1973 to 1981.

Kolding played a total 64 games for Brøndby IF in all competitions.

References

1952 births
Living people
Danish men's footballers
Denmark international footballers
Denmark under-21 international footballers
Boldklubben af 1893 players
Roda JC Kerkrade players
Brøndby IF players
Danish expatriate men's footballers
Expatriate footballers in the Netherlands
Association football forwards